Szabolcs Szabó (born 11 February 1979) is a geographer and politician, who has been a Member of Parliament (MP) for Csepel–Soroksár (Budapest Constituency XVII) since 2014.

Biography
Szabó was born in Gyula on 11 February 1979. He finished his secondary studies at the Széchenyi István Economics and Foreign Trade Secondary School in Békéscsaba. He earned a degree of geographer at the Faculty of Sciences of the Eötvös Loránd University in 2002. He teaches as an assistant lecturer since 2004 and as an lecturer there since 2010. He is an elected member of the board of the university's Institute of Geography and Earth Sciences.

As a member of the Hungarian Solidarity Movement, he joined Together party. He was the joint individual candidate of the Unity electoral alliance in Budapest Constituency XVII during the 2014 parliamentary election. He defeated Fidesz politician Szilárd Németh and gained a parliamentary seat. He became an independent MP, as Together was unable to form a caucus according to the house rules. He was involved in the Culture Committee.

Szabó was again nominated as his party's candidate for the individual seat of Csepel–Soroksár during the 2018 parliamentary election. Following long disputes, his candidacy was also supported by MSZP, LMP and Momentum. Szabó again defeated Szilárd Németh (Fidesz), becoming his party's only MP, as Together did not reach the 5% election threshold. Subsequently, he joined the LMP parliamentary group, "with whom he can best agree on a political-ideological point of view". Following internal conflicts within the party, Szabó left the LMP's parliamentary group on 2 October 2018, alongside Bernadett Szél.

References

1979 births
Living people
People from Gyula
Eötvös Loránd University alumni
Together (Hungary) politicians
Hungarian educators
Hungarian geographers
Members of the National Assembly of Hungary (2014–2018)
Members of the National Assembly of Hungary (2018–2022)
Members of the National Assembly of Hungary (2022–2026)